Lalit Yadav can refer to:

 Lalit Yadav (Delhi cricketer) (born 1997), Indian cricketer
 Lalit Yadav (Vidarbha cricketer) (born 1995), Indian cricketer